Tomas Mikael Nord (born July 18, 1958) is a retired Swedish professional ice hockey defenceman. He played fifteen seasons in Elitserien, for Leksands IF and AIK IF. He won the Swedish Championship in 1984 with AIK.

External links

1958 births
AIK IF players
Leksands IF players
Living people
Swedish ice hockey defencemen
Swedish ice hockey coaches